Newsreaders is an American television comedy that aired on Cartoon Network's late night programming block Adult Swim. Newsreaders is a spin-off of Childrens Hospital, presented as the fictional television news magazine program Newsreaders. The series premiered January 17, 2013 and ended on February 13, 2015, with a total of 24 episodes over the course of two seasons.

Cast

Hosts
Mather Zickel as Louis LaFonda (season 1)
Alan Tudyk as Reagan Biscayne (season 2)

Correspondents
Dannah Phirman as Narge Hemingway
Beth Dover as Sadee Deenus
Alison Becker as Xandra Dent
Kumail Nanjiani as Amir Larussa
Randall Park as Clavis Kim (season 2)

Commentator
Ray Wise as Skip Reming
David Wain as Jim Davidson (season 2)

Episodes

Series overview

Season 1 (2013)

Season 2 (2014–15)
Guest appearances in season two include Randall Park (as correspondent Clavis Kim), Billy Ray Cyrus, Malin Åkerman, Rob Huebel (as fictional Childrens Hospital star Rob Heubel), Rob Riggle, Martin Starr, James Urbaniak, Tom Lennon, Danny Pudi, Scott Adsit, Jenna Fischer, Mel Cowan, Ryan Hansen, Marc Evan Jackson, Steve Little, Harold Perrineau, the Sklar Brothers, David Wain, and David Hasselhoff.

References

External links
 

2010s American black comedy television series
2010s American satirical television series
2010s American television news shows
2013 American television series debuts
2015 American television series endings
Adult Swim original programming
American news parodies
American television spin-offs
English-language television shows
Television series by Warner Bros. Television Studios
Television series by Williams Street